Jasmin Moghbeli (born ) is an American U.S. Marine Corps test pilot and NASA astronaut. She is a graduate of the Massachusetts Institute of Technology, Naval Postgraduate School and Naval Test Pilot School. , she has accumulated over 2,000 hours of flight time and flown in 150 combat missions, including sorties in Afghanistan.

Early life and education

Moghbeli was born on June 24, 1983, in Bad Nauheim, West Germany, to an Iranian family. Her parents, Fereshteh and Kamy Moghbeli are originally from the city of Mahabad in northwestern Iran and had fled Iran following the 1979 Islamic Revolution, and subsequently emigrated to the United States, where they settled in Baldwin, New York. Moghbeli attended Baldwin Senior High School in New York and Advanced Space Academy at the Huntsville Space Camp in Alabama while she was a student. She earned a bachelor's degree in aerospace engineering with information technology at the Massachusetts Institute of Technology (MIT), and played volleyball and basketball for the MIT Engineers.

Military career 

Moghbeli was commissioned as an officer in the United States Marine Corps in 2005, and trained to become an AH-1 Super Cobra pilot. While in service with the Marine Corps, she deployed overseas three times and completed 150 combat missions. Moghbeli received a master's degree in aerospace engineering from the U.S. Naval Postgraduate School in California and also attended the U.S. Naval Test Pilot School at Patuxent River Naval Air Station in Maryland, becoming a helicopter test pilot with VMX-1 at Marine Corps Air Station Yuma in Arizona.

NASA career
In June 2017, Moghbeli was selected as a member of NASA Astronaut Group 22, and subsequently began her two-year training.

In January 2020, she graduated alongside 13 others in the NASA Astronaut Candidate Training Program, officially making her "eligible for spaceflight, including assignments to the International Space Station, Artemis missions to the Moon, and ultimately, missions to Mars."

In March 2022, she was assigned as commander of the SpaceX Crew-7 mission to the International Space Station scheduled to launch in 2023. This will be her first space flight.

Awards and honors 
Moghbeli has received four Air Medals, a Navy and Marine Corps Commendation Medal, and three Navy and Marine Corps Achievement Medals.  She has also received the U.S. Navy Test Pilot School Class 144 Outstanding Developmental Phase II Award and the Commander Willie McCool Outstanding Student Award as the Class 144 Honor Graduate.

References

External links

 Biography of Astronaut Jasmin Moghbeli
 Interview in The New Yorker magazine
 
 

Living people
United States Marine Corps astronauts
American people of Iranian descent
People from Bad Nauheim
MIT School of Engineering alumni
United States Marine Corps officers
1983 births
Military personnel from New York (state)
People from Baldwin, Nassau County, New York
Women astronauts
Female United States Marine Corps personnel
Naval Postgraduate School alumni
Helicopter pilots
MIT Engineers athletes
American test pilots
College women's basketball players in the United States
MIT Engineers women's volleyball players